Tinea imbricata (also known in parts of Indonesia as “Kaskado”) is a superficial fungal infection of the skin limited to southwest Polynesia, Melanesia, Southeast Asia, India, and Central America. The skin lesions are often itchy, and mainly in the torso and limbs. The name is derived from the Latin for "tiled" (imbricata) since the lesions are often lamellar. It is often treated with griseofulvin or terbinafine.

The risk of developing tinea imbricata is probably inherited as an autosomal recessive trait.

Tinea imbricata is associated with Trichophyton concentricum.

Tinea pseudoimbricata
The term "tinea pseudoimbricata" synonymous with "tinea indecisiva", was coined to describe a form of tinea mimicking the concentric rings of tinea imbricata, but is caused by local or systemic immunosuppression. Since then, 3 cases of Trichophyton tonsurans have been associated with it, as well as Trichophyton rubrum which can trigger mycosis fungoides.
Mixed infections with scabies have been described to produce tinea pseudoimbricata.

As of 2015 in India, corticosteroid–antifungal–antibacterial combinations sold as over-the-counter drug have led to an increase in chronic, recurrent, difficult to treat fungal infections of the skin, including tinea pseudoimbricata.

See also 
 Skin lesion
 List of cutaneous conditions

References

External links 

Mycosis-related cutaneous conditions